Clarksville is the county seat of Montgomery County, Tennessee, United States. It is the fifth-largest city in the state behind Nashville, Memphis, Knoxville, and Chattanooga. The city had a population of 166,722 as of the 2020 United States census.

It is the principal central city of the Clarksville, TN–KY metropolitan statistical area, which consists of Montgomery and Stewart counties in Tennessee, and Christian and Trigg counties in Kentucky.
The city was founded in 1785 and incorporated in 1807, and named for General George Rogers Clark, frontier fighter and Revolutionary War hero, and brother of William Clark of the Lewis and Clark Expedition.

Clarksville is the home of Austin Peay State University; The Leaf-Chronicle, the oldest newspaper in Tennessee; and neighbor to the Fort Campbell, United States Army post.

History

Before colonization and Native American history

The area now known as Tennessee was first settled by Paleo-Indians nearly 11,000 years ago. The names of the cultural groups that inhabited the area between first settlement and the time of European contact are unknown, but several distinct cultural phases have been named by archaeologists, including Archaic, Woodland, and Mississippian, whose chiefdoms were the cultural predecessors of the Muscogee, who inhabited the Tennessee River Valley prior to Cherokee migration into the river's headwaters.

When Spanish explorers first visited Tennessee, led by Hernando de Soto in 1539−43, it was inhabited by tribes of Muscogee and Yuchi people. Possibly because of European diseases devastating the native tribes, which would have left a population vacuum, and also from expanding European settlement in the north, the Cherokee moved south from the area now called Virginia. As European colonists spread into the area, the native populations were forcibly displaced to the south and west, including all Muscogee and Yuchi peoples, the Chickasaw, and Choctaw. From 1838 to 1839, nearly 17,000 Cherokees were forced to march from "emigration depots" in Eastern Tennessee, such as Fort Cass, to Indian Territory west of Arkansas. This came to be known as the Trail of Tears; as an estimated 4,000 Cherokees died along the way.

Colonization

The area around Clarksville was first surveyed by Thomas Hutchins in 1768. He identified Red Paint Hill, a rock bluff at the confluence of the Cumberland and Red Rivers, as a navigational landmark.

In the years between 1771 and 1775, John Montgomery, the namesake of the county, along with Kasper Mansker, visited the area while on a hunting expedition. In 1771, James Robertson led a group of 12 or 13 families involved with the Regulator movement from near where present-day Raleigh, North Carolina now stands. In 1772, Robertson and the pioneers who had settled in northeast Tennessee (along the Watauga River, the Doe River, the Holston River, and the Nolichucky River) met at Sycamore Shoals to establish an independent regional government known as the Watauga Association.

However, in 1772, surveyors placed the land officially within the domain of the Cherokee tribe, who required negotiation of a lease with the settlers. Tragedy struck as the lease was being celebrated, when a Cherokee warrior was murdered by a white man. Through diplomacy, Robertson made peace with the Cherokee, who threatened to expel the settlers by force if necessary.

In March 1775, land speculator and North Carolina judge Richard Henderson met with more than 1,200 Cherokees at Sycamore Shoals, including Cherokee leaders such as Attakullakulla, Oconostota, and Dragging Canoe. In the Treaty of Sycamore Shoals (also known as the Treaty of Watauga), Henderson purchased all the land lying between the Cumberland River, the Cumberland Mountains, and the Kentucky River, and situated south of the Ohio River in what is known as the Transylvania Purchase from the Cherokee Indians. The land thus delineated, encompassed an area half as large as the present state of Kentucky. Henderson's purchase was in violation of North Carolina and Virginia law, as well as the Royal Proclamation of 1763, which prohibited private purchase of American Indian land. Henderson may have mistakenly believed that a newer British legal opinion had made such land purchases legal.

All of present-day Tennessee was once recognized as Washington County, North Carolina. Created in 1777 from the western areas of Burke and Wilkes Counties, Washington County had as a precursor a Washington District of 1775–76, which was the first political entity named for the Commander-in-Chief of American forces in the Revolution.

Founding
In 1779, Hadley W. and Hannah W. brought a group of settlers from upper East Tennessee via Daniel Boone's Wilderness Road. Hadley and Hannah later built an iron plantation in Cumberland Furnace. A year later, John Donelson led a group of flat boats up the Cumberland River bound for the French trading settlement, French Lick (or Big Lick), that would later be Nashville. When the boats reached Red Paint Hill, Moses Renfroe, Joseph Renfroe, and Solomon Turpin, along with their families, branched off onto the Red River. They traveled to the mouth of Parson's Creek, near Port Royal, and went ashore to settle down. Clarksville was designated as a town to be settled in part by soldiers from the disbanded Continental Army that served under General George Washington during the American Revolutionary War.

At the end of the war, the federal government lacked sufficient funds to repay the soldiers, so the Legislature of North Carolina, in 1790, designated the lands to the west of the state line as federal lands that could be used in the land grant program. Since the area of Clarksville had been surveyed and sectioned into plots, it was identified as a territory deemed ready for settlement. The land was available to be settled by the families of eligible soldiers as repayment of service to their country.

The development and culture of Clarksville has had an ongoing interdependence between the citizens of Clarksville and the military. The formation of the city is associated with the end of the American Revolutionary War. During the Civil War a large percent of the male population was depleted due to Union Army victories at Fort Henry and Fort Donelson. Many Clarksville men were interned at Union prisoner of war (POW) camps.

Clarksville lost many native sons during World War I. With the formation of Camp Campbell, later Fort Campbell, during World War II, the bonds of military influence were strengthened. Soldiers from Fort Campbell, Kentucky have deployed in every military campaign since the formation of the post.

On January 16, 1784, John Armstrong filed notice with the Legislature of North Carolina to create the town of Clarksville, named after General George Rogers Clark.

Even before it was officially designated a town, lots had been sold. In October 1785, Col. Robert Weakley laid off the town of Clarksville for Martin Armstrong and Col. Montgomery, and Weakley had the choice of lots for his services. He selected Lot #20 at the northeast corner of Spring and Main Streets. The town consisted of 20 'squares' of 140 lots and 44 out lots. The original Court House was on Lot #93, on the north side of Franklin Street between Front and Second Street. The Public Spring was on Lot #74, on the northeast corner of Spring and Commerce Streets. Weakley built the first cabin there in January 1786, and about February or March, Col. Montgomery came there and had a cabin built, which was the second house in Clarksville.

After an official survey by James Sanders, Clarksville was founded by the North Carolina Legislature on December 29, 1785. It was the second town to be founded in the area. Armstrong's layout for the town consisted of 12 four-acre (16,000 m2) squares built on the hill overlooking the Cumberland as to protect against floods. The primary streets (from north to south) that went east–west were named Jefferson, Washington (now College Street), Franklin, Main, and Commerce Streets. North–south streets (from the river eastward) were named Water (now Riverside Drive), Spring, First, Second, and Third Streets.

The tobacco trade in the area was growing larger every year and in 1789, Montgomery and Martin Armstrong persuaded lawmakers to designate Clarksville as an inspection point for tobacco.

When Tennessee was founded as a state on June 1, 1796, the area around Clarksville and to the east was named Tennessee County. (This county was established in 1788, by North Carolina.) Later, Tennessee County would be broken up into modern day Montgomery and Robertson counties, named to honor the men who first opened up the region for settlement.

19th century
Clarksville grew at a rapid pace. By 1806, the town realized the need for an educational institution, and it established the Rural Academy that year. It was later replaced by the Mount Pleasant Academy. By 1819, the newly established town had 22 stores, including a bakery and silversmith. In 1820, steamboats begin to navigate the Cumberland, bringing hardware, coffee, sugar, fabric, and glass. The city exported flour, tobacco, cotton, and corn to ports such as New Orleans and Pittsburgh along the Ohio and Mississippi rivers.

In 1829, the first bridge connecting Clarksville to New Providence was built over the Red River. Nine years later, the Clarksville-Hopkinsville Turnpike was built. Railroad service came to the town on October 1, 1859, in the form of the Memphis, Clarksville and Louisville Railroad. The line would later connect with other railroads at Paris, Tennessee and at Guthrie, Kentucky.

By the start of the Civil War, the combined population of the city and the county was 20,000. Planters in the area depended on enslaved African Americans as workers in the labor-intensive tobacco industry, one of the major commodity crops.

In 1861, both Clarksville and Montgomery counties voted unanimously for the state to secede and join the Confederate States of America. The birthplace of Confederate President Jefferson Davis was about 20 miles across the border in Fairview, Christian County, Kentucky. Both sides considered Clarksville to be of strategic importance.

Confederate General Albert Sidney Johnston set up a defense line around Clarksville expecting a land attack. The city was home to three Confederate States Army camps:
 Camp Boone located on U.S. Highway 79 Guthrie Road/(Wilma Rudolph Boulevard),
 Camp Burnet
 Fort Defiance, Tennessee, a Civil War outpost that overlooks the Cumberland River and Red River, and was occupied by both Confederate and Union soldiers. In 2012 the City of Clarksville, Tennessee completed construction of an interpretive/ museum center here to chronicle the local chapter in the Civil War.

The Union sent troops and gunboats down the Cumberland River, and in 1862 captured Fort Donelson, and Fort Henry. On February 17, 1862, the USS Cairo, along with another Union ironclad, came to Clarksville and its troops captured the city. There were no Confederate soldiers to contend with because they had left prior to the arrival of the ships. White flags flew over Ft. Defiance and over Ft. Clark. Those town citizens who could get away, left as well. Before leaving, Confederate soldiers tried to burn the railroad bridge that crossed the Cumberland River, so that the Union could not use it. But the fire did not take hold and was put out before it could destroy the bridge. This railroad bridge made Clarksville very important to the Union. The USS Cairo tied up in Clarksville for a couple of days before moving to participate in the capture of Nashville.

Between 1862 and 1865, the city would shift hands, but the Union retained control of Clarksville. It also controlled the city's newspaper, The Leaf Chronicle, for three years. Many slaves who had been freed or escaped gathered in Clarksville and joined the Union Army lines. The army set up contraband camps in mid-Tennessee cities, to provide shelter for the freedmen families. Other freed slaves lived along the side of the river in shanties. The Army enlisted freedmen in all-black regiments, in some cases putting them to work in building defenses. The 16th United States Colored Infantry regiment was mustered in at Clarksville in 1863.

Reconstruction

After the war, the city began Reconstruction, and in 1872, the existing railroad was purchased by the Louisville & Nashville Railroad. The city was flourishing until the Great Fire of 1878, which destroyed 15 acres (60,000 m2) of downtown Clarksville's business district, including the courthouse and many other historic buildings. It was believed to have started in a Franklin Street store. After the fire, the city rebuilt. The first automobile rolled into town, drawing much excitement.

20th century

In 1913, the Lillian Theater, Clarksville's first "movie house" for motion pictures, was opened on Franklin Street by Joseph Goldberg. It seated more than 500 people. Less than two years later, in 1915, the theater burned down. It was rebuilt later that year.

As World War I raged in Europe, many locals volunteered to go, reaffirming Tennessee as the Volunteer State, a nickname earned during the War of 1812, the Mexican–American War and other earlier conflicts. Also during this time, women's suffrage was becoming a major issue. Clarksville women saw a need for banking independent of their husbands and fathers who were fighting. In response, the First Women's Bank of Tennessee was established in 1919 by Mrs. Frank J. Runyon.

The 1920s brought additional growth to the city. A bus line between Clarksville and Hopkinsville was established in 1922. In 1927 the Austin Peay Normal School was founded, later to develop as Austin Peay State University. In 1928 two more theaters were added, the Majestic (with 600 seats) and the Capitol (with 900 seats). John Outlaw, a local aviator, established Outlaw Field in 1929.

With the entry of the United States into World War II, defense investments were made in the area. It was capable of holding 23,000 troops, and as staffing built up, the base gave a huge boost to the population and economy of Clarksville.

In 1954, the Clarksville Memorial Hospital was founded along Madison Street. Downtown, the Lillian was renamed the Roxy Theater, and today it still hosts plays and performances weekly. The Roxy has been used as a backdrop for numerous photo shoots, films, documentaries, music videos and television commercials; most notably for Sheryl Crow's Grammy Award-winning song "All I Wanna Do."

Since 1980, the population of Clarksville has more than doubled, in part because of annexation, as the city acquired communities such as New Providence and Saint Bethlehem. The construction of Interstate 24 north of Saint Bethlehem added to its development potential and in the early 21st century, much of the growth along U.S. Highway 79 is commercial retail. Clarksville is currently one of the fastest-growing large cities in Tennessee. At its present rate of growth, the city was expected to displace Chattanooga by 2020 as the fourth-largest city in Tennessee.

Natural disasters

On the morning of January 22, 1999, the downtown area of Clarksville was devastated by an F3 tornado, damaging many buildings including the county courthouse. No one was seriously injured or killed in the destruction. Clarksville has since recovered, and has rebuilt much of the damage. Where one building on Franklin Street once stood has been replaced with a large mural of the historic buildings of Clarksville on the side of one that remained.

On Sunday, May 2, 2010, Clarksville and a majority of central Tennessee, to include Nashville and 22 counties in total, suffered expansive and devastating floods near the levels of the great flood of 1937. Many businesses along Riverside Drive along the Cumberland River were lost.

On the evening of February 24, 2018, the east side of Clarksville was struck by a strong EF-2 tornado. Two injuries were reported and a spokesperson for the Montgomery County Sheriffs Office stated four homes and two duplexes were destroyed, dozens more damaged and 75 vehicles damaged at the nearby Hankook Tire plant.

History of the county courthouse

The first Montgomery County courthouse was built from logs in 1796 by James Adams. It was located close to the riverbank with the rest of the early town, on the corner of present-day Riverside Drive and Washington Street. It was replaced by a second courthouse built in 1805, and a third in 1806, with land provided by Henry Small. The fourth courthouse was built in 1811, and was the first to be built of brick. It was constructed on the east half of Public Square, with land donated by Martin Armstrong. In 1843, a courthouse was built at a new location on Franklin Street. It was destroyed in the Great Fire of 1878.

The sixth courthouse was built between Second and Third Streets, with the cornerstone laid on May 16, 1879. It was designed by George W. Bunting of Indianapolis, Indiana. Five years later, the downtown area was hit by a tornado, which damaged the roof of the courthouse. It was repaired. On March 12, 1900, the structure was ravaged by fire, with the upper floors gutted and the clock tower destroyed. Some citizens wanted the building replaced, but the judge refused and ordered the damage repaired.

The courthouse was very seriously damaged by the January 22, 1999 tornado. Residents considered replacing it with a new building, but decided to restore and reconstruct the historic structure. In the process it was upgraded and adapted for use as a county office building. On the fourth anniversary of the disaster, the courthouse was rededicated. In addition to restoring the 1879 courthouse and plazas, the county built a new courts center on the north side for the court operations.

Geography

Fort Campbell North is a census-designated place (CDP) in Christian County, Kentucky. It contains most of the housing for the Fort Campbell Army base. The population was 14,338 at the 2000 census. Fort Campbell North is part of the Clarksville, TN–KY Metropolitan Statistical Area.

Climate
The climate is humid subtropical (Köppen: Cfa) with hot summers and cold winters but interspersed with milder times due to its location between the warmer climates of the Gulf of Mexico and the colder ones of the Midwest. Freezing temperatures are not uncommon but usually the averages are above zero in January (around 2 °C) and in July can often pass through 25 °C. Snow in winter is common, but large accumulated amounts are more sporadic; usually the soil is covered by a thin layer during some time of winter. Precipitation is abundant year-round without any major difference, but May tends to have the highest cumulative amount of 142 mm in the form of rain. The wet season runs from February through July, while the dry season runs from August through January with a September nadir of 85 mm and secondary December peak of 125 mm.

Demographics

2020 census

As of the 2020 United States census, there were 166,722 people, 58,985 households, and 39,595 families residing in the city.

2017
According to the U.S. Census Bureau, the 2017 population estimate for Clarksville was 153,205. Of that total, 66.6% were white, 23.1% were African-American, 10.8% were Hispanic or Latino, 4.9% multiple races, 2.4% Asian, 0.5% American Indian and Alaska Native, and 0.5% Native Hawaiian and other Pacific Islander.

The 2010 census estimated that 51.3% of the population in Clarksville were female, while 48.7% were male.

Of the 51,776 households, 38.8% had children under the age of 18 living with them, 48.9% were married couples living together, 17.3% had a female householder with no husband present, and 29.1% were not families. About 23.0% of all households were made up of individuals, and 5.1% had someone living alone who was 65 years of age or older. The average household size was 2.63 and the average family size was 3.09.

The median income for a household in the city was $48,679, and for a family was $56,295. Males had a median income of $41,019 versus $31,585 for females. The per capita income for the city was $23,722 (4th highest per capita personal income in Tennessee). About 12.4% of families and 16.5% of the population were below the poverty line, including 23.4% of those under age 18 and 11.5% of those age 65 or over.

In the June 2004 issue of Money, Clarksville was listed as one of the top five cities with a population of under 250,000 that would attract creative class jobs over the next 10 years.

Economy
Major industrial employers in Clarksville include:
 Agero, Inc., driver assistance services
 Amazon.com, Inc., Distribution Center (Opening Late 2022)
 Atlas BX, a member of the Hankook Tire Family, produces Batteries for start-stop vehicles
 American Standard
 Bridgestone Metalpha USA
 Convergys Corporation
 FedEx, Distribution Center (Opening Late 2022)
 Florim Tile Company US Headquarters and Production plant
 Fort Campbell
 Google
 Hankook Tires
 Jostens, printing and publishing division
 LG
 Microvast, Electric Car Battery Manufacturer 
 Multi-Color Corporation, label printing company
Nyrstar Clarksville (zinc refinery)
 SPX Corporation, metal forge division
 Trane, Clarksville's largest private employer

Arts and culture

Points of interest

 Roxy Theatre, located in downtown Clarksville
 F&M Bank Arena, Opening in 2023, Future Home of Austin Peay Men's and Women's Basketball
 Governor's Square Mall
 Clarksville City Arboretum
 Ringgold Mill, located in North Clarksville
 Port Royal State Park, historic community site and location of one of the oldest points of European civilization in Montgomery County
 Historic Collinsville, historic village restored to illustrate the living conditions of early European and African American settlers
 Customs House Museum and Cultural Center, located in downtown Clarksville, second largest general museum in Tennessee
 L & N Train Station, restored downtown train station
 Wilma Rudolph, statue honoring one of America's most outstanding Olympic athletes
 Dunbar Cave
 Fortera Stadium, home of Austin Peay Football
 Cumberland River
 Liberty Park and Marina
 Fort Defiance, Civil War fort overlooking the Cumberland River

Government
In 1907, Clarksville was among several cities in Tennessee that gained legislative approval to adopt a board of commission form of government, with commissioners elected by at-large voting. Its population was 9,000. Other cities adopting a board of commission were Chattanooga and Knoxville in 1911, Nashville in 1913, and Jackson, Tennessee in 1915. The result of this change favored election of candidates favored by the majority in each city. It closed out minorities from being able to elect candidates of their choice to represent them in local government.

Clarksville changed its government system, and in the 21st century has a 12-member city council elected from single-member districts, which has increased the range of representation. In 2015, four of the members are African American and eight are white. The mayor is elected at-large. Mayor Joe Pitts was elected in 2019 and defeated former Mayor Kim McMillan who was the first woman mayor of any Tennessee city with more than 100,000 population.

 James E. Elder, circa 1820
 ?
 George Smith, circa 1860
 A. Howell, 1882-1886
 G.A. Ligon, circa 1890
 Thomas H. Smith, 1891
 N.L. Carney, 1892
 W.B. Young, circa 1902
 W.D. "Pete" Hudson, 1928-1938
 William Kleeman, circa 1945, 1953, 1955–1956
 Paul M. McGregor, circa 1954, 1957
 W. W. Barksdale, circa 1960
 Charles Crow, circa 1963
 Ted Crozier, circa 1970s, 1983, 1985
 Don Trotter, 1987–1999, 2003-2007
 Johnny Piper, 1999–2002, 2007-2010
 
 Kim McMillan, 2011–2018
 Joe Pitts, 2019–Present

Education

Colleges and universities
 Austin Peay State University
 Daymar Institute
 Miller-Motte Technical College
 Nashville State Community College
 North Tennessee Bible Institute

Public schools

The city consolidated its school system with that of the county, forming the Clarksville-Montgomery County School System. It operates a total of 39 public schools to serve about 37,666 students, including eight high schools, seven middle schools, 24 elementary schools, and one magnet school for K–5, in addition to Middle College on the campus of Austin Peay State University.

Public high schools (grades 9–12) in Clarksville-Montgomery County:
 Clarksville High School (1,500 students)
 Kenwood High School (1,255 students)
 Kirkwood High School (Opening 2023-24 School Year)
 Montgomery Central High School (1,030 students)
 Northeast High School (1,539 students)
 Northwest High School (1,317 students)
 Rossview High School (1,935 students)
 West Creek High School (1,609 students)

Private schools
Private schools in Clarksville-Montgomery County include:
 Clarksville Academy (students: 613; ST; grades: PK–12)
 Immaculate Conception School (students: 146; grades: K–8)
 Little Scholars Montessori (students: 91; grades: Preschool–5)
 Clarksville Christian School

Infrastructure

Major roads and highways
 U.S. Route 41A (Madison Street and Fort Campbell Boulevard)
 U.S. Route 79 (Wilma Rudolph Boulevard)
 Interstate 24 (designated a control city along route)
 State Route 12 (Ashland City Road)
 State Route 13
 State Route 48
 State Route 76 (Martin Luther King Jr. Parkway)
 State Route 374 (Warfield Blvd., 101st Airborne Division Parkway, Purple Heart Parkway)

Air
Outlaw Field accommodates an average of slightly over 32,000 private and corporate flight operations per year (average for 12-month period ending 2014), and is also home to a pilot training school and a few small aircraft companies. It has two asphalt runways, one  and the other . Outlaw Field has received a $35,000 grant. A new terminal building was built in 2011–2012.

Cobb Field was a small private airfield. It had one grass/sod runway that measured . This airfield was not open to the public and is no longer suitable for landing aircraft due to runway encroachment by nearby trees and brush, as well as fencing across the former runway. Cobb Field is no longer displayed on VFR sectional charts available from the FAA.

Clarksville Transit has 11 bus routes, and the service operates Mondays-Saturdays.

Sports
Clarksville was home to several Minor League Baseball teams that played in the Kentucky–Illinois–Tennessee League during the first half of the 20th century. They were called the Clarksville Villagers (1903), Grays (1904), Volunteers (1910 and 1916), Billies (1911), Rebels (1912), Boosters (1913–1914), Owls (1916), and Colts (1947–1949). It also hosted a team of the independent Big South League and Heartland League from 1996 to 1997 called the Clarksville Coyotes.

Notable people
 Roy Acuff – country music star, associated with Grand Ole Opry and Hee Haw television series
 James E. Bailey – U.S. Senator from Tennessee
 David Bibb – acting administrator of General Services Administration (GSA)
 Willie Blount – former governor of Tennessee (1809–1815)
 Robert Burt – African-American surgeon
 Leon Henry Buck - African-American musician and actor
 Ben Clark – mountaineer, second youngest American to climb Mount Everest
 Philander Claxton – professor, Commissioner of U.S. Department of Education, APSU president
 Nate Colbert – MLB player
 Gretchen Cordy – reality TV personality, Survivor: Borneo, local radio DJ
 Riley Darnell – state senator and former Tennessee Secretary of State
 Mark Day – NASCAR race car driver
 Dorothy Dix – pen name of Elizabeth Meriwether Gilmer, famous for newspaper advice column
 Harry Galbreath – football player with Miami Dolphins, Green Bay Packers, and New York Jets
 Brock Gillespie – professional basketball player
 Jeff Gooch – former football player with Tampa Bay Buccaneers and Detroit Lions
 Ernest William Goodpasture – pathologist and physician
 Caroline Gordon – novelist and wife of Allen Tate
 Clay Greenfield - NASCAR Xfinity and Truck Series Driver
 William J. Hadden, Jr. - (1921–1995) Protestant minister, politician, television presenter
 Trenton Hassell – NBA player with Minnesota Timberwolves, Chicago Bulls, Dallas Mavericks, New Jersey Nets
 Whit Haydn – magician, vice-president of Magic Castle
 Roland Hayes – musician
 Tommy Head – member of Tennessee House of Representatives
 Jimi Hendrix – guitarist, singer and songwriter
 Gustavus Adolphus Henry Sr. – "Eagle Orator of Tennessee"
 Percy Howard – wide receiver for Dallas Cowboys
 Douglas S. Jackson – member of Tennessee Senate
 Cave Johnson – Congressman and U.S. Postmaster General under President James K. Polk
 Howard Johnson – football player and U.S. Marine killed in Battle of Iwo Jima
 Micah Johnson – Miami Dolphins linebacker
 Dorothy Jordan – film actress
 Joseph Buckner Killebrew – educator, lawyer, originator of liberal public school law
 Nate Landwehr - UFC Fighter (Featherweight)
 Jalen Reeves-Maybin – NFL linebacker Detroit Lions
 Horace Lisenbee – MLB player, pitcher for Washington Senators
 Horace Harmon Lurton – Justice of U.S. Supreme Court
 John Hartwell Marable – member of U.S. House of Representatives
 Shawn Marion – NBA and Olympic basketball player
 Isaac Murphy – first Reconstruction-era governor of Arkansas
 Robert Loftin Newman – oil painter
 Mary C. Noble – judge of Kentucky Supreme Court
 Norris W. Overton – U.S. Air Force Brigadier General
 Wayne Pace – CFO of Time Warner
 Asahel Huntington Patch – also known as A. H. Patch, inventor of Blackhawk corn sheller
 Austin Peay – Governor of Tennessee (1922–1927); namesake of Austin Peay State University
 Thomas Minott Peters – lawyer and botanist
 Chonda Pierce – Christian comedian and performer
 Key Pittman – U.S. Senator from Nevada
 Alex Poythress – NBA & former University of Kentucky basketball player
DJ Pryor – stand-up comedian and actor
 Jeff Purvis – NASCAR driver
 James B. Reynolds – member of U.S. House of Representatives
 Phil Roe – politician
 Mason Rudolph – professional golfer
 Wilma Rudolph – first female athlete to win three gold medals in single Olympic games
 Brenda Vineyard Runyon – founder and director of First Woman's Bank of Tennessee (1919–1926)
 Clarence Saunders – grocer, founder of Piggly Wiggly
 Evelyn Scott – writer, poet, and novelist
 Valentine Sevier – Revolutionary War soldier and brother of John Sevier (first governor of Tennessee)
 George Sherrill – baseball player
 Rachel Smith – Miss Tennessee USA and Miss USA (2007)
 Rick Stansbury – basketball coach
 Travis Stephens – football player with Tampa Bay Buccaneers
 James Storm – professional wrestler
 William "Sammy" Stuard – chairman of Tennessee Bankers Association, CEO of F&M Bank
 Pat Summitt – University of Tennessee at Knoxville women's basketball coach, Hall of Famer
 Frank Sutton – actor, played Sergeant Vince Carter in Gomer Pyle, USMC TV series
 Allen Tate – poet
 Sloan Thomas – wide receiver for Tennessee Titans
 Mageina Tovah – actress
 Jamie Walker – MLB relief pitcher
 Robert Penn Warren – poet
 Bubba Wells – APSU alumnus and NBA player
 William Westmoreland – military commander in Vietnam
 Clarence Cameron White – musician
 James "Fly" Williams – player in original American Basketball Association
 Howie Wright – NBA player
 Ryne Harper – baseball player
 Ricky Lumpkin - NFL player for the Raiders, Cardinals, and Colts. Graduated from Kenwood High School
 Scotty Kilmer - Car Mechanic and YouTube Personality

In popular culture
 The Monkees 1966 #1 song "Last Train to Clarksville" is sometimes said to reference the city's train depot and a soldier from Fort Campbell during the Vietnam War era, but Clarksville was actually picked just for its euphonious sound. The band filmed parts of the song's music video in Clarksville.
 The music video for the 1986 song "Twenty Years Ago" by country singer Kenny Rogers was filmed on Franklin Street in Clarksville, Tennessee.

Nicknames
Clarksville's nicknames have included  The Queen City, Queen of the Cumberland, and Gateway to the New South. In April 2008, the city adopted "Tennessee's Top Spot!" as its new brand nickname.

References

Bibliography

External links

 
 

 
Cities in Montgomery County, Tennessee
Clarksville metropolitan area
County seats in Tennessee
Populated places established in 1785
1785 establishments in North Carolina 
Cities in Tennessee